Johan Asiata (born December 19, 1985) is a gridiron football offensive lineman who is currently a free agent. He was signed as an undrafted free agent by the Chicago Bears in 2009. He played college football at UNLV.

Early years and college career
Born in Christchurch, New Zealand, Asiata later lived in Kalihi, Hawaii and attended the National Guard Youth Challenge Academy, a military school in Kapolei. Asiata then moved to California to attend Yuba College. After playing junior college football at Yuba in 2004 and 2005, Asiata transferred to the University of Nevada, Las Vegas, where he played at offensive line for UNLV Rebels football from 2007 to 2008. During his senior year at UNLV, he earned honorable Mention All-Mountain West Conference honors and started all 12 games for UNLV and did not allow a sack.

Professional career

Chicago Bears
Asiata signed with the Chicago Bears on April 27, 2009. and spent most of 2009 on the practice squad but was in consideration to start at left guard in 2010.

On September 2, 2011, he was waived by Chicago.

Saskatchewan Roughriders
On April 24, 2012, Asiata was signed by the Saskatchewan Roughriders.

BC Lions
Along with Levi Horn and Andre Ramsey, Asiata was signed by the BC Lions on March 26, 2013.

Los Angeles Kiss
On October 4, 2013, Asiata was assigned to the Los Angeles Kiss of the Arena Football League.

Personal

References

External links
Chicago Bears bio
UNLV Rebels bio

1985 births
Living people
New Zealand sportspeople of Samoan descent
Sportspeople from Christchurch
Players of American football from Hawaii
American sportspeople of Samoan descent
American football offensive guards
UNLV Rebels football players
Chicago Bears players
New Zealand players of American football
Saskatchewan Roughriders players
BC Lions players
Los Angeles Kiss players
New Zealand emigrants to the United States
Junior college football players in the United States